Musnad Humaidi or Musnad Humaydi, is one of the Hadith books attributed to Imam Al-Humaydi  (d. 219 AH).

Description
The book contains almost one thousand five hundred (1500) hadiths according to Maktaba Shamila. It is one of the oldest Musnad (a kind of Hadith book) written. It is written in second century of Islamic Calendar and written before the most authentic book of Hadiths (narrations of the Islamic prophet Muhammad) that are Sahihain (Sahih al-Bukhari & Sahih Muslim). The Musnad (مسند) are collections of Hadiths which are classified by narrators, and therefore by Sahabas (companions of Muhammad). The book contain Sahih (authentic), weak and fabricated narrations.

Publications
The book has been published by many organizations around the world: 
   Musnad Humaidi Urdu 
  Al-Mirwiyat al-Haskiyya through Musnad al-Humaidi, Publisher: University of Anbar جامعة الانبار

See also
 List of Sunni books
 Kutub al-Sittah
 Jami al-Tirmidhi
 Sunan Abu Dawood
 Jami' at-Tirmidhi
 Either: Sunan ibn Majah, Muwatta Malik

References

9th-century Arabic books
10th-century Arabic books
Sunni literature
Hadith
Hadith collections
Sunni hadith collections